Spione: Story Now in Cold War Berlin is a role-playing game published by Ron Edwards in 2007.

Description
Spione: Story Now in Cold War Berlin is a spy role-playing game set in Cold War Berlin.

Publication history
According to Shannon Appelcline, after games like It Was a Mutual Decision and Trollbabe, Ron Edwards "outlined his next project as part of an essay he wrote in 2003 called 'Narrativism: Story Now'; he began serious work on it around 2005, and finally published the hefty 244-page Spione: STORY NOW in Cold War Berlin (2007) a few years later. As the name suggests, it's a spy game set in World War II Berlin, but it covers a subgenre of spy novels that Edwards calls 'Spy vs. Guy fiction.' Here, the characters are more endangered by psychological crises than by the enemy."  For Edwards, his primary goal for the game was to "write a book on what he calls 'Cold War Triumphalism' — the idea that the fall of the Soviet Union allowed the United States to retroactively rewrite history to justify their military and economic power." Edwards also hoped to sell the game throughout Europe in places that would not normally carry role-playing games, using its focus on the history of espionage and the Cold War.

Reception

References

Adept Press games
Espionage role-playing games
Role-playing games introduced in 2007